Tidelands is an  Australian streaming television series. The eight-part series is written and created by Stephen M. Irwin and Leigh McGrath, and is produced by Hoodlum Entertainment. It was released on 14 December 2018 on Netflix. Series 1 left some issues unresolved, but as of 2021, no plans have emerged to film a second series.

Overview
Tidelands follows the story of Cal McTeer, who served ten years in prison for an alleged murder while a teenager. She returns home to the small fishing village of Orphelin Bay. She encounters a group of dangerous siren–human hybrids called "Tidelanders", the result of occasional sexual relations between sirens and marine fishermen, while exploring the mysterious appearance of a fisherman's corpse. Filming for the series began in Brisbane and continued through southeastern Queensland.

The plotlines pit the Tidelanders, who largely occupy a communal settlement ruled by a matriarch, Adrielle Cuthbert, with the Orphelin Bay townspeople, many of whom are well aware of the Tidelanders' origins and power over centuries, and of the existence of the secretive and rarely-glimpsed sirens. The townsfolk are paid off or choose to keep their knowledge to themselves, since the Tidelanders are dangerous, and the local fishing cooperative benefits from a lucrative drug trade, recuperating and selling drugs imported and hidden offshore by the Tidelanders' dealers. Relationships between sirens and men, Tidelanders and humans, and some of the other central characters complicate the story of Adrielle's search for fragments of an ancient magical horn made by sirens which, if sounded, would bring destruction on the human world. Cal McTeer's arrival back in Orphelin Bay upsets power dynamics, and she emerges as a powerful challenger to Adrielle, after Cal's origins and identity are questioned and she realises she too has siren powers, including breathing underwater, longevity, seduction, and manipulating fluids.

Locations
Much of the filming took place in and around Moreton Bay, close to Brisbane in South East Queensland, Australia. Aerial shots of the fictional Orphelin Bay were filmed further north in Dunwich, North Stradbroke Island. Cal and Augie's house is at 153 Palm Ave in Shorncliffe a coastal suburb of Brisbane, Devil's Tail bar is the Old Courthouse Restaurant at Raby Bay, and the Orphelin Bay Fishing Cooperative facilities are in Steiglitz.

Cast

Main
 Charlotte Best as Calliope "Cal" McTeer
 Aaron Jakubenko as Augie McTeer
 Marco Pigossi as Dylan Seager
 Richard Davies as Colton Raxter
 Dalip Sondhi as Lamar Cloutier
 Mattias Inwood as Corey Welch 
 Jacek Koman as Gregori Stolin
 Elsa Pataky as Adrielle Cuthbert

Recurring
 Alex Dimitriades as Sgt. Paul Murdoch
 Peter O'Brien as Bill Sentelle 
 Madeleine Madden as Violca Roux
 Jet Tranter as Leandra
 Caroline Brazier as Rosa
 Hunter Page-Lochard as Jared
 Annabelle Stephenson as Laura Maney
 Cate Feldmann as Genoveva
 Finn Little as Gilles
 Chloe De Los Santos as Bijou
Alex Andreas as Lev Nuyland

Episodes

References

External links

2018 Australian television series debuts
2018 Australian television series endings
English-language Netflix original programming
Mythology in popular culture
Mermaids in television
Television shows set in Queensland